Charles Duncan O'Neal Bridge is a bridge in Bridgetown, Barbados. It is one of two bridges over the Careenage, the other being the Chamberlain Bridge, although unlike the Charles Duncan Bridge it does not take traffic. It is named after Charles Duncan O'Neal who founded the radical Democratic League in 1924.

References

Buildings and structures in Bridgetown
Bridges in Barbados